St. Nicholas of Tolentine High School was a four-year, coeducational Catholic high school located in the University Heights neighborhood of the Bronx, New York. A parochial school operated by the parish of the same name, St. Nicholas of Tolentine Church, it opened in 1927 and closed in 1991, after years of declining enrollment.

The school was known for its basketball program. In 1975, Tolentine was the nation's highest ranked high school.

Notable alumni
Former basketball stars include Ernie Myers, Malik Sealy, who attended St. John's University; Brian Reese, the University of North Carolina; and Adrian Autry, Syracuse. Finbarr O'Neill, former CEO of J.D. Power, Hyundai Motor America and Mitsubishi Motors North America was also an alumnus.

References

Educational institutions established in 1927
Educational institutions disestablished in 1991
Defunct high schools in the Bronx
Defunct boys' schools in the United States
Defunct Catholic secondary schools in New York City
University Heights, Bronx
Roman Catholic high schools in the Bronx
1927 establishments in New York City